Ripon and Hampden was an electoral district of the Legislative Assembly in the Australian state of Victoria from 1859 to 1904. It was based in western Victoria.

Ripon and Hampden, along with Polwarth and South Grenville, were created after the Electoral district of Polwarth, Ripon, Hampden and South Grenville was divided in 1859.

Members for Ripon and Hampden

After Ripon and Hampden was abolished in 1904, the Electoral district of Hampden was created. David Oman, the last representative of Ripon and Hampden went on to represent Hampden from 1904 to 1927.

References

Former electoral districts of Victoria (Australia)
1859 establishments in Australia
1904 disestablishments in Australia